Rashad Ernest Bell (born September 23, 1982) is an American professional basketball player who is currently a free agent. He also holds a Hungarian passport.

References

External links
 Rashad Bell college stats @ sports-reference.com

1982 births
Living people
Basketball players from New York City
Alba Fehérvár players
Al-Mina'a basketball players
American expatriate basketball people in the Dominican Republic
American expatriate basketball people in Egypt
American expatriate basketball people in Greece
American expatriate basketball people in Hungary
American expatriate basketball people in Iraq
American expatriate basketball people in Italy
American expatriate basketball people in Lebanon
American expatriate basketball people in the Philippines
American expatriate basketball people in Saudi Arabia
American expatriate basketball people in South Korea
American expatriate basketball people in Uruguay
American men's basketball players
Anyang KGC players
Apollon Patras B.C. players
Basket Rimini Crabs players
BC Körmend players
Boston University Terriers men's basketball players
Forwards (basketball)
Gezira basketball players
Holargos B.C. players
Daegu KOGAS Pegasus players
Philippine Basketball Association imports
Powerade Tigers players
Sportspeople from Queens, New York
Szolnoki Olaj KK players
TNT Tropang Giga players
Sagesse SC basketball players